David Raum (born 22 April 1998) is a German professional footballer who plays as a left midfielder or left back for Bundesliga club RB Leipzig and the Germany national team.

Club career

Greuther Fürth
Raum was born in Nuremberg and started playing football at the local club Tuspo Nürnberg at the age of four. At the age of eight he was scouted to the youth academy of SpVgg Greuther Fürth in the neighbouring town and progressed through their youth teams.

As an under-19 player, Raum gained his first experience in the senior sides and was part of the first team from the 2017–18 2. Bundesliga season. In the first two rounds of the 2017–18 DFB-Pokal he scored in both games, but did not make it to the final round with his team after a defeat against FC Ingolstadt. In addition, Raum made 20 appearances in at second-highest German level and mainly played as a substitute in the following seasons. His contract, which was set to expire in June 2020, was extended with an option for an additional year in May 2020.

1899 Hoffenheim
After the 2020–21 season, in which Greuther Fürth won promotion to the Bundesliga, Raum moved to 1899 Hoffenheim as a free agent, after having signed a pre-contract with the club in January 2021. He signed a four-year deal with Die Kraichgauer.

RB Leipzig
On 31 July 2022, he joined Bundesliga club RB Leipzig, on a five-year deal until 2027.

International career
Raum made a total of eleven international appearances at under-19 and under-20 levels.

After making his debut on 17 November 2020 in a 2–1 win over Wales for the under-21 team, under-21 national team coach Stefan Kuntz called up Raum for the squad for the 2021 UEFA European Under-21 Championship. He was utilised in all games, as Germany won the final 1–0 over Portugal.

He debuted with the senior Germany national team in a 6–0 2022 FIFA World Cup qualification win over Armenia on 5 September 2021.

Career statistics

Club

International

Honours
Germany U21
UEFA European Under-21 Championship: 2021

Individual
Bundesliga Team of the Season: 2021–22
UEFA European Under-21 Championship Team of the Tournament: 2021

References

External links
 Profile at the RB Leipzig website
 

1998 births
Living people
Footballers from Nuremberg
German footballers
Germany international footballers
Germany youth international footballers
Germany under-21 international footballers
Olympic footballers of Germany
Association football midfielders
SpVgg Greuther Fürth players
SpVgg Greuther Fürth II players
TSG 1899 Hoffenheim players
RB Leipzig players
Bundesliga players
2. Bundesliga players
Regionalliga players
Footballers at the 2020 Summer Olympics
2022 FIFA World Cup players